Zayandeh Rud (also Romanized as Zāyandeh Rūd) is a village in Jowshan Rural District, Golbaf District, Kerman County, Kerman Province, Iran. At the 2006 census, its population was 72, in 20 families.

References 

Populated places in Kerman County